Productos Mendoza, S.A., is a manufacturer of both air guns and conventional firearms, based in Mexico. It was founded in 1911 by Rafael Mendoza Blanco. Initially, Productos Mendoza manufactured firearms for troops under General Francisco Villa during the Mexican Revolution.  It currently manufactures the HM-3 9mm caliber submachine-gun, which is used by police and security forces within Mexico, as well as the PUMA, a semi-automatic rifle chambered for the .22 long rifle cartridge.

It also manufactures a variety of staplers and hole-punches for office and student use.

See also
Mendoza C-1934
Mendoza HM-3
Mendoza RM2
Mendoza PM-1

References

Firearm manufacturers of Mexico
Manufacturing companies of Mexico
Mexican brands